Events from the year 1722 in Canada.

Incumbents
French Monarch: Louis XV
British and Irish Monarch: George I

Governors
Governor General of New France: Philippe de Rigaud Vaudreuil
Colonial Governor of Louisiana: Jean-Baptiste Le Moyne de Bienville
Governor of Nova Scotia: John Doucett
Governor of Placentia: Samuel Gledhill

Events
 The Tuscarora become the sixth tribe of the Iroquois Confederacy.
 Haudenosee League admits Tuscarora as 6th Nation. The refugee band was accepted according to the terms of the League Constitution. No other Native Nations had such a provision as this, other alliances and "confederations" were all temporary and informal.

Births
 March 23 - born Marguerite-Thérèse Lemoine Despins (1722–1792) the second Mother Superior of the Grey Nuns. (died 1792)

Deaths

Historical documents
"[T]o gain the Indians[...]is to sell them no rum, nor to chett them in[...]trade, and to lett them know [we] will be their master."

Haudenosaunee urge French not to regarrison their village near Montreal because soldiers make women unsafe and youth disruptive

Abenaki at Nanrantsouak defer to Jesuit missionary in religion, council and relations with New Englanders (Note: "savages" used)

Passenger reports capture with others on sloop from Annapolis Royal by French-allied Indigenous men at Passamaquoddy

Gov. Shute declares war on "our Eastern Indians" who kill settlers, as Gov. Vaudreuil admits supporting attacks on vessels

New York requests garrisons on Indigenous land to extend frontier to Great Lakes for trade strategy spanning Mississippi to St. Lawrence

New York's expanding influence on Lake Ontario approved of, though building Niagara fort needs "consent of the Indian Proprietors"

Though "flourishing state of" Canso fishery would draw settlers, survey delay prevents Nova Scotia governor from granting land

Several forts needed for security of Nova Scotia, most immediately at Canso, where French dispute British "sole right" to fishery

Nova Scotia leaders report attacks on British ships and residents, with hostage-taking by both sides

New York Assembly strengthens law against "the selling of Indian goods to the French," which does most to increase French power

Commodore in Newfoundland must intervene when New Englanders "entice and carry away handycraftmen, seamen and fishermen"

"[O]ther men[...]run away with my works" - Mariner complains about someone preempting him with Nova Scotia map based on his data

References 

 
Canada
22